James or Jim Boyle may refer to:

Politicians
James Boyle (Fianna Fáil politician) (died 1944), Fianna Fáil Member of the 1934–1936 Seanad Éireann
James Boyle (Irish Parliamentary Party politician) (1863–1936), Irish politician, Member of Parliament for West Donegal 1900–1902
James Boyle (Maine politician) (born 1958), state senator for the 6th District of Maine
James Carr-Boyle, 5th Earl of Glasgow (1792–1869), British politician and naval commander
James P. Boyle (1885–1939), American politician
James J. Boyle (1891–1970), member of the California legislature
James Boyle (died 1594), Member of Parliament (MP) for Hereford

Sports
Jimmy Boyle (baseball) (1904–1958), American baseball player
Jimmy Boyle (footballer) (born 1967), Scottish footballer
James Boyle (footballer, born 1866) (1866–?), Scottish footballer
Jim Boyle (American football)
Jim Boyle (bowls)
Jim Boyle (basketball)

Others
James Boyle (academic) (born 1959), Scottish professor of law
James Boyle (broadcasting) (born 1946), British arts broadcaster
Jimmy Boyle (artist) (born 1944), Scottish sculptor and novelist, former gangster
Breakage (musician), real name James Boyle, British producer and DJ
James Boyle, sole survivor of the collision of the coalship Retriever and the SS Connemara
James W. Boyle (1922–1971), Malaysian jazz musician
Jimmy Boyle (record producer) (born 1967), American record producer, songwriter and musician